This is a list of airlines currently operating in East Timor.

See also

 List of airlines
 List of airports in East Timor
 List of defunct airlines of East Timor

External links
 Aero Dili
 Air Timor
 Mission Aviation Fellowship East Timor

East Timor
Airlines
East Timor
Airlines